Toledo is an unincorporated community in Callaway County, in the U.S. state of Missouri. The community is on routes JJ and UU, approximately six miles east of Fulton.

History
A post office called Toledo was established in 1887, and remained in operation until 1905. The origin of the name Toledo is obscure.

References

Unincorporated communities in Callaway County, Missouri
Unincorporated communities in Missouri
Jefferson City metropolitan area